Public Health Reports (or PHR) is a peer-reviewed public health journal established in 1878 and published by SAGE Publishing for the Association of Schools and Programs of Public Health and the United States Public Health Service. The title and publication frequency of the journal has varied over the years, but it is currently published bimonthly. The editor-in-chief is Hazel D. Dean. Articles are published under delayed open access, where they become fully open access one year after publication. The articles are available through PubMed Central.

History
The journal was established in July 1878 as the Bulletins of the Public Health under the National Quarantine Act of April 29, 1878, issued by the Supervising Surgeon-General at the time, John Maynard Woodworth. This act requested weekly reports of epidemic disease infections to be forwarded to Washington by the American consulates abroad.

Publication was suspended after 46 issues on May 24, 1879 as a byproduct of the creation of the National Board of Health and its takeover of the Quarantine Act responsibilities. During this period, the Board of Health instead published the reports in its National Board of Health Bulletin. The responsibility for the Quarantine Act returned to the Surgeon General in 1883, and in 1887 the journal resumed publication as the Weekly Abstract of Sanitary Reports.

Thus, the first volume of the journal was published in 1878 as the Bulletins of the Public Health, and volumes 2–10 were published from 1887 to 1895 as the Weekly Abstract of Sanitary Reports. From 1896 to 1970 (volumes 11–85) it was published as Public Health Reports, and then it went through two brief periods of other names (volume 86 and the first two issues of volume 87 were published as HSMHA Health Reports from 1971 to 1972, while the remainder of volume 87 to the third issue of volume 89 were published as Health Services Reports, from 1972–1974) before returning to the Public Health Reports name with the fourth issue of volume 89 in 1974. It continues to be published under the same name.

In 1952, the journal absorbed three other journals, the CDC Bulletin, the Journal of Venereal Disease Information, and Tuberculosis Control.

In January, 1918, a case of influenza in Haskell County, Kansas was diagnosed by local doctor Loring Miner. Miner published about the case in the April 1918 Public Health Reports. This is believed to be the first documented case of the global influenza pandemic of 1918.

Abstracting and indexing
The journal is abstracted and indexed in CAB Abstracts, CINAHL, Current Contents/Social & Behavioral Sciences, Current Contents/Clinical Medicine, EBSCOhost, Embase/Excerpta Medica, Index Medicus/MEDLINE/PubMed, LexisNexis, Science Citation Index, Scopus, and the Social Sciences Citation Index. According to the Journal Citation Reports, the journal has a 2014 impact factor of 4.547.

References

External links

US Public Health Service

Delayed open access journals
Public health journals
English-language journals
Publications established in 1878
Academic journals published by learned and professional societies